Clayton Creek is a stream in southern Iron County in the U.S. state of Missouri. It is a tributary of the Middle Fork of the Black River.

The stream flows to the south-southwest past the Keith Springs picnic area and then south for approximately 4.5 miles passing the community of Redmondville just prior to entering the Middle Fork Black River.

Clayton Creek has the name of a pioneer citizen.

See also
List of rivers of Missouri

References

Rivers of Iron County, Missouri
Rivers of Missouri
Tributaries of the Black River (Arkansas–Missouri)